Blair Erwin Underwood (born August 25, 1964) is an American actor. He made his debut in the 1985 musical film Krush Groove and from 1987 to 1994 starred as attorney Jonathan Rollins in the NBC legal drama series L.A. Law.

Underwood has appeared in a number of films during his career, including Just Cause (1995), Set It Off (1996), Deep Impact (1998), Rules of Engagement (2000), Something New (2006), Madea's Family Reunion (2006), and Juanita (2019). On television, he played a leading role in the 2000 medical drama City of Angels, and also had regular roles in High Incident (1996–97), LAX (2004–05), Dirty Sexy Money (2007–09), In Treatment (2008), The Event (2010–11), Ironside (2013) and Quantico (2016–18). Underwood has received two Golden Globe Award nominations, five NAACP Image Awards, one Daytime Emmy Award, and one Grammy Award.

Early life
Underwood was born in Tacoma, Washington, the son of Marilyn Ann Scales, an interior decorator, and Frank Eugene Underwood Sr., a United States Army colonel. Underwood lived on bases and Army Posts in the United States and Stuttgart, Germany throughout his childhood due to his father's military career. Blair attended Petersburg High School in Petersburg, Virginia. He went on to attend the Carnegie Mellon School of Drama in Pittsburgh, Pennsylvania, and is an honorary member of the Phi Beta Sigma fraternity.

Career

After his film debut, Krush Groove, Underwood's 1985 appearance on The Cosby Show landed him a short stint for three months on the ABC soap opera One Life to Live as Bobby Blue. He later co-starred in the short-lived CBS crime drama series Downtown from 1986 to 1987, and guest-starred on Scarecrow and Mrs. King and 21 Jump Street.

In 1987, Underwood, at the age of 23, was cast as attorney Jonathan Rollins in the NBC legal drama series L.A. Law. He received Golden Globe Award nomination for Best Supporting Actor – Series, Miniseries or Television Film in 1991. The series ended in 1994. In 1990, he played James Chaney in the NBC television film Murder in Mississippi. In 1993, he co-starred in the western film Posse starring Mario Van Peebles. After L.A. Law, he starred in a number of movies, In 1995 he appeared in the  legal thriller Just Cause, and the following year played Jada Pinkett's love interest in the heist film Set It Off. He also had a supporting role as a geneticist in the science fiction film Gattaca (1997) and in the disaster film Deep Impact (1998). In 1996, he was featured in the July issue of erotic magazine Playgirl.

In 1996, Underwood returned to series television with ABC police drama series, High Incident. He co-starred opposite Cicely Tyson in the 1998 miniseries Mama Flora's Family. In 2000, he played the lead role in the short-lived CBS medical drama series City of Angels. Underwood was voted one of People magazine's "50 Most Beautiful People" in 2000, and one of TV Guide magazine's "Most Influential Faces of the 90s". In 2003, he guest starred in four episodes on the HBO series Sex and the City playing Cynthia Nixon's love interest. In 2004, he played the role of Roger De Souza opposite Heather Locklear in NBC short-lived drama LAX. In 2006, he appeared in the Tyler Perry's second film, Madea's Family Reunion. He had a recurring role as the sexy grade school teacher in the CBS sitcom The New Adventures of Old Christine opposite Julia Louis-Dreyfus from 2006 to 2008. In 2007, he guest starred in an episode of the NBC series Law & Order: Special Victims Unit. In 2007, Underwood portrayed Jesus Christ in Inspired By... The Bible Experience, an 89-hour, celebrity-voiced, fully dramatized audio Bible based on Today's New International Version. Also in 2007, Underwood co-authored the novel Casanegra: A Tennyson Hardwick Novel with husband-and-wife team Steven Barnes and Tananarive Due.

In 2008, Underwood starred in the first season of the HBO drama series In Treatment, for which he was nominated for Best Supporting Actor – Series, Miniseries or Television Film at the 2009 Golden Globes. From 2007 to 2009, he was regular cast member in the ABC prime time soap opera, Dirty Sexy Money.

In 2010–2011, Underwood portrayed United States President Elias Martinez in the NBC drama series The Event. In 2010, Underwood portrayed the role of Saint Mark in The Truth & Life Dramatized Audio New Testament Bible, a 22-hour, celebrity-voiced, fully dramatized audio New Testament, based on the RSV-CE translation. In 2012, he played the lead role of Stanley in the Broadway revival of A Streetcar Named Desire.

In 2013, Underwood played the role of Robert Ironside in the remake of the successful 1960s television series, Ironside, made famous by the late Raymond Burr.  The show was cancelled after three episodes. The following year, he appeared in The Trip to Bountiful opposite Cicely Tyson. From 2015 to 2016, he had a recurring role in the ABC series Agents of S.H.I.E.L.D.. In 2016, Underwood was cast in the ABC thriller series Quantico for the series regular role of CIA Deputy Director, Owen Hall. The series was canceled after three seasons in 2018.

In 2019, Underwood played attorney Bobby Burns in the Netflix miniseries When They See Us. The following  year, he co-starred opposite Octavia Spencer in the Netflix miniseries Self Made: Inspired by the Life of Madam C.J. Walker.

In January 2020, Underwood appeared on stage as Captain Richard Davenport in the Roundabout Theatre Company's Broadway revival of Charles Fuller's Pulitzer Prize-winning drama A Soldier's Play.

Personal life
Underwood is a part of several charitable organizations. He won the 1993 Humanitarian Award for his work with the Los Angeles chapter of the Muscular Dystrophy Association. In 2003, along with Ashley Judd, he served as the spokesperson for YouthAIDS.  In addition, he is involved with the AIDS Healthcare Foundation's Blair Underwood Clinic in Washington, DC.

Underwood also appeared in a 2004 public service announcement for The Fulfillment Fund.  He is a Trustee for the Robey Theatre Company in Los Angeles, a non-profit theatre group founded by Danny Glover, focusing on plays about the Black experience.

He supported President Barack Obama's candidacy and spoke at campaign rallies for Obama. Underwood got to know Obama while researching his L.A. Law role at Harvard Law School, while Obama was president of the Harvard Law Review.

Filmography

Film

Television
{| class="wikitable sortable"
|+List of television appearances and roles
|-
! scope="col" | Year
! scope="col" | Title
! scope="col" | Role
! scope="col" class="unsortable" | Notes
|-
| 1985 || Knight Rider || Potts || Episode: "Knight of the Juggernaut: Part 1"
|-
| 1985 || The Cosby Show || Robert, Denise's Friend || Episode: "Jitterbug Break"
|-
| 1985 || The Cosby Show || Mark || Episode: "Theo and the Other Woman"
|-
| 1985–1986 || One Life to Live || Bobby Blue || Regular cast
|-
| 1986–1987  ||  Downtown || Terry Corsaro || Main cast
|-
| 1987 || Scarecrow and Mrs. King || Stillman || Episode: "All That Glitters"
|-
| 1987 || 21 Jump Street || Reginald Brooks || Episode: "Gotta Finish the Riff"
|-
| 1987–1994 || L.A. Law || Jonathan Rollins || Main castNAACP Image Award for Outstanding Actor in a Drama SeriesNominated—Golden Globe Award for Best Supporting Actor – Series, Miniseries or Television Film
|-
| 1988 || Mickey's 60th Birthday || Johnathon Rollins || TV movie
|-
| 1989 || The Cover Girl and the Cop || Horace Bouchet || TV movie
|-
| 1990 || Murder in Mississippi || James Chaney || TV movieNAACP Image Award for Outstanding Actor in a Television Movie, Mini-Series or Dramatic Special
|-
| 1990 || Heat Wave || Robert Richardson || TV movie
|-
| 1991 ||  || Zelmer Collier || Episode: "War and Peace"
|-
| 1993 || Father & Son: Dangerous Relations || Jared Williams || TV movie
|-
| 1996 || Duckman || Blair Underwood (voice) || Episode: "Pig Amok" 
|-
| 1996 || Soul of the Game || Jackie Robinson || TV movieNominated—NAACP Image Award for Outstanding Actor in a Television Movie, Mini-Series or Dramatic Special
|-
| 1996 || Mistrial || Lieutenant C. Hodges || TV movie
|-
| 1996–1997 || High Incident || Officer Michael Rhoades || Main cast
|-
| 1998 || Mama Flora's Family || Willie || TV movieNAACP Image Award for Outstanding Actor in a Television Movie, Mini-Series or Dramatic Special
|-
| 2000 || City of Angels || Dr. Ben Turner || Main castNAACP Image Award for Outstanding Actor in a Drama Series
|-
| 2003–2004 || I Love the '90s || Himself || Commentator
|-
| 2004 || Sex and the City || Dr. Robert Leeds || Recurring castNominated—NAACP Image Award for Outstanding Supporting Actor in a Comedy Series (2004–05)
|-
| 2004–2005 || Fatherhood || Dr. Arthur Bindlebeep || Main cast
|-
| 2004–2005 || LAX || Roger De Souza || Main cast
|-
| 2006–2010 ||  || Mr. Harris || Recurring castNominated—NAACP Image Award for Outstanding Supporting Actor in a Comedy Series (2008–09)
|-
| 2006 || Covert One: The Hades Factor || Palmer Addison || TV movie
|-
| 2007 || Law & Order: Special Victims Unit || Miles Sennett || Episode: "Burned"
|-
| 2007–2009 || Dirty Sexy Money || Simon Elder || Main castNominated—NAACP Image Award for Outstanding Supporting Actor in a Drama Series (2008–09)
|-
| 2008 || In Treatment || Alex || Main castNominated—Golden Globe Award for Best Supporting Actor – Series, Miniseries or Television FilmNominated—NAACP Image Award for Outstanding Actor in a Drama Series
|-
| 2010–2011 || The Event  || President Elias Martinez || Main castNominated—NAACP Image Award for Outstanding Actor in a Drama Series
|-
| 2012 || Superman of Tokyo || Superman of Tokyo || 2 episodes
|-
| 2013 || Thunder and Lightning || Black Lightning || 2 episodes
|- 
| 2013 || Ironside || Robert Ironside || Main cast
|-
| 2014 || The Trip to Bountiful || Ludie Watts || TV movieNAACP Image Award for Outstanding Actor in a Television Movie, Mini-Series or Dramatic SpecialNominated—Critics' Choice Television Award for Best Supporting Actor in a Movie/Miniseries
|-
| 2015–2016 || Agents of S.H.I.E.L.D. || Andrew Garner || Recurring cast
|-
| 2016–2019 || The Lion Guard || Makuu (voice) || Recurring cast
|-
| 2016 || The Good Wife || Harry Dargis || Episode: "Shoot"
|-
| 2016 || Sofia the First || Sir Jaxon (voice) || Episode: "The Secret Library: The Tale of the Noble Knight"
|-
| 2016–2018 || Quantico || Owen Hall || Main cast 
|-
| 2019 || When They See Us || Bobby Burns || Miniseries
|-
| 2019 || Dear White People || Professor Moses Brown || Recurring cast 
|-
| 2020 || Self Made || Charles James Walker || Miniseries 
|-
| 2020 || Your Honor || Roland Carter || Episode: "Part One"
|-
| 2021 || Impeachment: American Crime Story || Vernon Jordan || 3 episodes
|-
| 2021 || Love Life || Leon Hines || Episode: "Suzanné Hayward & Leon Hines"
|-
| || Three Women || Richard || Upcoming series
|}

Video games

 Bibliography 
 Before I Got Here: The Wondrous Things We Hear When We Listen to the Souls of Our Children (2005; editor, with Donyell Kennedy-McCullough (photographer))
 The Tennyson Hardwick Novels:
 Casanegra (2007; with Tananarive Due and Steven Barnes)
 In the Night of the Heat (2008; with Tananarive Due and Steven Barnes)
 From Cape Town with Love (2010; with Tananarive Due and Steven Barnes)
 South by Southeast'' (scheduled for September 2012; with Tananarive Due and Steven Barnes)

Awards and nominations

References

External links

Official Website
ANSA: Artists For A New South Africa

1964 births
African-American writers
American writers
American male film actors
American male soap opera actors
American people of Igbo descent
American people of Cameroonian descent
Carnegie Mellon University College of Fine Arts alumni
Living people
People from Petersburg, Virginia
Male actors from Tacoma, Washington
Male actors from Virginia
American male voice actors
American male television actors
African-American male actors
20th-century American male actors
21st-century American male actors
Grammy Award winners